Bizarre Creations Limited was a British video game development studio based in Liverpool, best known for their racing titles Metropolis Street Racer (Dreamcast) and the follow-up Project Gotham Racing series (Xbox, Xbox 360, mobile phones and Zune HD). The company has also developed games in other genres, including the Geometry Wars arcade series, plus the third-person shooters Fur Fighters and The Club. Bizarre Creations was acquired by publisher Activision in 2007, and subsequently completed its racer Blur in May 2010.

On 20 January 2011, Activision announced Bizarre Creations would close, and later confirmed the date. Bizarre marked the closure by releasing a retrospective video of its work.

History 

Bizarre Creations started as Raising Hell Software, founded by Martyn Chudley. Sega scorned "Hell", and the company went nameless for a short time. In 1994, a pending submission to Psygnosis/Sony forced the decision of a new name. The founder tentatively left "Weird Concepts" on the submission documentation. Then a staff member used Microsoft Word's thesaurus, and "Bizarre Creations" stuck.

The Bizarre Creations team was initially five strong, and worked on a concept project called "Slaughter". After seeing the demo, Psygnosis signed the team onto Formula 1 for PlayStation. Formula 1 went on to become the best-selling game in Europe in 1996.

On 26 September 2007, publisher Activision acquired Bizarre Creations for $107.4m; $67.4m immediately payable with a further $40m contingent hitting certain goals over a 5-year period.

Activision announced that Project Gotham Racing 4 would be Bizarre Creations' last game for Microsoft Game Studios, and Microsoft did retain the rights for the Project Gotham Racing franchise.

On 16 November 2010, Activision announced it was considering closing Bizarre and "exploring our options regarding the future of the studio, including a potential sale of the business". Activision later stated that no buyer could be found and that the studio would close. The studio would conclude with a two minute farewell video, put together by in-house editor Eamon Urtone.

Pete Collier, Ben Ward and Stephen Cakebread of Bizarre Creations founded mobile game developer Hogrocket in 2011, and shut it down the following year.

Games developed

References

External links 
 

British subsidiaries of foreign companies
Defunct Activision subsidiaries
Defunct companies based in Liverpool
Video game companies established in 1988
Video game companies disestablished in 2011
Defunct video game companies of the United Kingdom
Video game development companies
1988 establishments in England
2011 disestablishments in England
2007 mergers and acquisitions